Duluth Central High School, also known as Central High School, was a secondary school located in Duluth, Minnesota, which educated students in grades ten through twelve until seventh and eighth were added after the closing of Washington Junior High School in 1992. It first opened in 1893 in the original building at the intersection of Lake Avenue and Second Street. The building was officially named Historic Old Central High School on October 19, 2004.

In 1971, the new Central High School building was built on top of the hill near the intersection of Central Entrance and Pecan Avenue. This Duluth Central High School closed at the end of the 2010–2011 school year.

History

When originally built on the hillside in 1892, Duluth Central High School was famed not only for its grand clock tower, which could be seen for miles, but also for its wide halls, sweeping stairways with iron banisters, large chandeliers, and beautiful statuary.

Due to age and safety conditions, the Duluth School Board decided in 1970 that it would have to build a new school to replace the Historic Old Central High School.  In 1971, the new Central High School building was built on top of the hill and the school moved there, leaving School District administrative offices in the old building.

In 2007, the Duluth School Board announced that they would support the long-range Red plan for the district which would close Duluth Central and keep a renovated Ordean Middle School (now Duluth East High School) and Duluth Denfeld High School as the only two high schools in Duluth.

2011 was the last graduating class of Duluth Central High School.  The grounds and the buildings would remain empty until sold by the school district.

In November 2013 the Duluth City Council met to finalize plans to rezone the land from an R-1 (residential zone) to a commercial C zone paving the way for ISD 709 to sell Central High School to potential land developers for commercial purposes. In December 2014, the sale of the property was announced. That sale was never finalized and as of Dec. 2017, the property is still listed as "For Sale".

It was announced on August 8, 2022, that Chester Creek View LLC purchased the majority of the property, including the school building.  Demolition of the building began on November 14, 2022.

Athletics
Big red was given to Duluth Central High School [teams] until 1930. In that year, students decided to change the name to the "Trojans". This was done through a contest in which all students could participate. The Trojan has been the symbol and name for Central [teams] ever since.

Central claimed numerous Minnesota State High School League state championships, with most of them coming in basketball, skiing, and ski jumping.  Central had many state championships in winter sports, including the individual downhill skiing champion 18 times between 1932 and 1962 and team champion six times.  Central also had a dominant ski jumping program with eight state ski jumping champions between 1939 and 1968 and 19 team championships between 1933 and 1974.
Central won the state debate title in 1922.
Central was state champion in boys basketball in 1950, 1961, 1971 (the first year of two classes, A and AA), and 1979.  Central was state champion in boys cross country running six times between 1943 and 1957.  Central won three consecutive boys golf titles from 1946 to 1948.  Central was boys track and field state champion four times in 1923, 1930, 1935, and 1936.

Alumni
Wellyn Totman, Hollywood screenwriter
Elmer McDevitt, football player and coach
Sam Solon,  politician
Terry Kunze, professional basketball player
Don LaFontaine, the voice actor who recorded more than 5,000 film trailers
Winifred Sanford, writer
Robert R. Gilruth, aerospace engineer and an aviation/space pioneer
Richard H. Hanson, politician
Jim Ojala, special effects and makeup artist, screenwriter, and film director
Ethel Ray Nance, civil rights activist
Don Ness, former Duluth mayor
Earl B. Gustafson, judge, lawyer, and politician
Lorenzo Music, actor, voice actor, writer, producer, and musician
Robert W. Peterson, physicist
Michael Baker, drummer
Jordan M Schmidt, music producer, songwriter

References

Educational institutions established in 1893
High schools in Duluth, Minnesota
Buildings and structures in Duluth, Minnesota
Defunct schools in Minnesota
1893 establishments in Minnesota